The Sacramento State Hornets baseball team represents California State University, Sacramento, which is located in Sacramento, California. The Hornets are an NCAA Division I college baseball program that competes in the Western Athletic Conference. They began competing in Division I in 1990 and re-joined the Western Athletic Conference in 2006. They were a part of the Big West Conference from 1997 to 2002.

The Sacramento State Hornets play all home games on campus at John Smith Field. The Hornets have played in three NCAA Division I Tournaments. Over their 19 discontinuous seasons in the Western Athletic Conference, they have won two WAC regular season titles and three WAC Tournaments.

Since the program's inception in 1949, six Hornets has gone on to play in Major League Baseball, including Philadelphia Phillies first baseman and outfielder Rhys Hoskins. Under head coach Reggie Christiansen, 22 Hornets have been drafted, including Rhys Hoskins who was selected in the fifth round of the 2014 Major League Baseball draft.

Conference membership history 
1990–1992: Independent
1993–1996: Western Athletic Conference
1997–2002: Big West Conference
2003–2005: Independent
2006–present: Western Athletic Conference

John Smith Field 

John Smith Field is a baseball stadium on the California State University, Sacramento campus in Sacramento, California that seats 1,200 people. It opened in 1953 and was known as Hornet Stadium. In 2010, it was named in honor of longtime coach John Smith.

Head coaches (Division I only) 
Records taken from the Sac State coaching history.

Year-by-year NCAA Division I results
Records taken from the Sac State year-by-year results.

NCAA Division I Tournament history
The NCAA Division I baseball tournament started in 1947.
The format of the tournament has changed through the years.
Sacramento State began playing Division I baseball in 1990.

Awards and honors (Division I only)

 Over their 31 seasons in Division I, two Hornets have been named to an NCAA-recognized All-America team.
 Over their 19 discontinuous seasons in the Western Athletic Conference, 8 different Hornets have been named to the all-conference first-team.
 Over their 6 seasons in the Big West Conference, one Hornet was named to the all-conference first-team.

All-Americans

Freshman First-Team All-Americans

Western Athletic Conference Coach of the Year

Western Athletic Conference Player of the Year

Western Athletic Conference Freshman of the Year

Taken from the Sac State awards and honors page. Updated March 21, 2020.

Hornets in the Major Leagues

Taken from the Sac State Hornets in the Pros page.

See also
List of NCAA Division I baseball programs

References

External links